Ranaghat Pal Choudhury High School is a school in West Bengal, India, in Ranaghat, Nadia District. It was established in 1853 by the Pal Choudhury family of Gatak Para, before Sepoy Mutiny. 

It is located on the bank of the Churni River, two km from the Ranaghat railway station along the Netaji Subhash Avenue.

Education system 
This school has education provision from class I to class XII. The medium of instruction is Bengali. The syllabus of the West Bengal Board is followed in primary secondary and high-secondary (Plus Two) system. Before the final board exam, two internal exams (known as Pre-Test and Test) are conducted by the school authority to see the status of the outgoing students.

Gallery

Notable people 
 Prabhat Kumar Mukhopadhyaya,  a Bengali author best known for his biography of Rabindranath Tagore

See also 
 Ranaghat
Education in India
List of schools in India
Education in West Bengal

References

External links

High schools and secondary schools in West Bengal
Schools in Nadia district
Educational institutions established in 1853
1853 establishments in India